The National Team Championship, which was played under a variety of names, was a team golf tournament played from 1965 to 1972. 
It was an official PGA Tour event from 1968 to 1972.

Tournament hosts
1965–1966 PGA National Golf Club, Palm Beach Gardens, Florida
1968 Quail Creek Golf & Country Club and Twin Hills Golf & Country Club, Oklahoma City, Oklahoma
1970–1972 Laurel Valley Golf Club, Ligonier, Pennsylvania (an 18-hole, par-71 championship course that opened in 1959, and was originally designed by Dick Wilson.)

Winners

Notes

References

Former PGA Tour events
Golf in Florida
Golf in Oklahoma
Golf in Pennsylvania
Sports in Oklahoma City